Makhdoom Sharfuddin Ahmed bin Yahya Maneri, popularly known as Makhdoom-ul-Mulk Bihari and Makhdoom-e-Jahan (1263–1381), was a 13th-century Sufi mystic.

Early life
Sharafuddin Ahmad ibn Yahya Maneri was born in Maner, a village near Patna in Bihar circa August 1263. His father was Makhdoom Yahya Maneri, a Sufi saint.

His maternal grandfather Shahabuddin JagjotBalkhi, whose tomb is located at Kachchi Dargah in Patna district, was also a revered Sufi.

At age 12, he left Maner to gain traditional knowledge of Arabic, Persian, logic, philosophy and religion. He was tutored by Ashraf-Uddin Abu Towama Bukhari, a famous scholar from Sonargaon near Narainganj (now in Dhaka, Bangladesh) with whom he spent 24 years.

At first, he refused to marry but, upon falling ill, he married Bibi Badaam. He left home after the birth of his son Zakiuddin in 1289 A.D. His son lived and died in Bengal.

Career 
After completing his education he left for Delhi where he met Nizamuddin and other Sufis. His elder brother Makhdoom Jaleeluddin Maneri (buried at Badi Dargah in Maner Sharif) accompanied him there, and introduced him to his pir (spiritual master) Sheikh Najeebuddin Firdausi.  In Delhi, he became a disciple of Sheikh Najeebuddin Firdausi of Mehrauli and was given the title of Firdausi.

To shun material comforts, Sheikh Sharfuddin Ahmed bin Yahya Maneri went into the forest of Bihiya (about 15 miles west of Maner). He later went to Rajgir (about 75 miles east of Maner) where he performed ascetic exercises in the hills. A hot spring close to a place where he often prayed in Rajgir is named Makhdoom Kund in his memory.

After 30 years in the forests, Sheikh Sharfuddin Ahmed bin Yahya Maneri settled at Bihar Sharif.Later Sultan Muhammad Tughlaq built a Khanqah for him where he taught and trained disciples in Sufism (Tasawwuf). He devoted his life to teaching and writing.

Bibliography

The collection of his letters (Maktoobat) and sermons (Malfoozat) received wide acclaim. His Maktoobat is regarded as a 'working manual' amongst the highest in Sufi circles.
Sharafuddin Maneri: The Hundred Letters (translated by Paul Jackson S.J.), Paulist Press, 1979, 480pp. 
 Maktubat-i-Sadi, a 'Series of a Hundred Letters' (essays on definite subjects) addressed to his disciple Qazi Shamsuddîn in 747 Hijra.
 Maktubat-i-Bist-o-hasht, a 'Series of 28 Letters', replies to the correspondence of his senior disciple, Muzaffar, the prince of Balkh.
 Fawaed-i-Ruknî, brief Notes prepared for the use of his disciple Rukn-ud-dîn.

Death
He died in 1381 A.D. (6 Shawwal, 782 Hijri).

The funeral prayer was said according to his will, which decreed that it be led by a Sufi from Semnan who was on his way to Pandua in Malda district of West Bengal to pledge spiritual allegiance on the hands of the renowned Sufi  Alaul Haq Pandavi and enter into the Chishti spiritual order. Accordingly,  Syed Ashraf Jahangir Semnani led the funeral prayers.

His tomb lies at Badi Dargah (Bihar Sharif Nalanda), in a mosque to the east of a large tank, with masonry walls and ghats, and pillared porticos. The tomb is situated in an enclosure half filled with graves and ancient trees, on the north and west of which are three domed mosque and cloisters. His tomb is a place of sanctity for devout Muslims. A five-day Urs is celebrated every year from 5th Shawwal with traditional zeal.

References

Indian Sufis
People from Patna district
1262 births
1379 deaths
13th-century Indian philosophers
14th-century Indian philosophers
Scholars from Bihar